Elwood Edwards (born November 6, 1949) is an American voice actor. He is best known as the voice of the Internet service provider America Online, which he first recorded in 1989.

Career 
Edwards started in radio while in high school. After high school he continued into television, working as a live booth announcer. Despite some on-air work, doing a car commercial, reporting news or sports and a short stint as a weatherman, Edwards focused mainly on off-camera work.

In 1989, Edwards' wife overheard online service Q-Link CEO Steve Case describe how he wanted to add a voice to its user interface. In October, Edwards' voice premiered on AOL's new program. His greetings include "Welcome", "You've got mail", "You've got pictures", "You've got voicemail", "File's done", and "Goodbye", all recorded in his own living room on a cassette deck. The voice is only heard in the American version of the software. In the UK version, a female voice (British actress Joanna Lumley) is heard replacing "Welcome" with "Welcome to AOL" and "You've got mail" with "You have e-mail" Also, "File's done" is replaced with "Your files have been transferred".

His voice has also appeared in a 2000 episode of The Simpsons, "Little Big Mom" (where he provided the voice of a virtual doctor, saying "You've got leprosy"), and in advertising for the movie You've Got Mail.

Now retired, he used to sell personalized .wav files through his website.

On the March 4, 2015, episode of The Tonight Show Starring Jimmy Fallon, Edwards appeared on screen to read phrases which were meant to be humorous. As of November 2016, Edwards was seen on Instagram and YouTube working as an Uber driver. On September 16, 2019, Edwards and his AOL story were featured on the podcast Twenty Thousand Hertz in an episode entitled "You've Got Mail".

In October 2022, Edwards appeared in a television ad for the e-commerce platform Shopify, in which he announced "You've got sales" to sellers on the platform.

Other jobs 
 News graphics supervisor, WKYC-TV
 General manager, KVVV
 Operations manager, WAKC-TV
 Operations supervisor/senior director, WFTY-TV
 Production manager/senior director, WCTI-TV
 Senior director, WITN-TV
 Announcer/director, WNBE-TV
 Announcer/DJ, WHIT-AM
 Uber driver

References 

Living people
1949 births
AOL people
American male voice actors
People from New Bern, North Carolina
Male actors from North Carolina
20th-century American male actors
People from Orrville, Ohio